Day by Day, Desperately is a 1961 Italian drama film written and directed by Alfredo Giannetti. According to the film critic Morando Morandini, the film is "a naturalistic drama of strong emotional charge, crossed by a vein of desperate lyricism."

Cast 

 Nino Castelnuovo: Gabriele Dominici
 Tomas Milian: Dario Dominici
 Madeleine Robinson: Tilde 
 Tino Carraro: Pietro 
 Franca Bettoia: Marcella 
 Milly: Luisella
 Riccardo Garrone: un cliente di Pietro Dominici
 Mario Scaccia: un infermiere del manicomio
 Rosalia Maggio: collega di Marcella
 Lino Troisi: un agente di Polizia 
 Marcella Rovena: amica di Pietro Dominici 
 Alvaro Piccardi: Daniele 
 Mario Brega: un borgataro

References

External links

1961 films
Italian drama films
Films directed by Alfredo Giannetti
Films scored by Carlo Rustichelli
1961 drama films
1961 directorial debut films
1960s Italian films